Oenopota greenlandica is a species of sea snail, a marine gastropod mollusk in the family Mangeliidae.

This is a nomen dubium.

Description

Distribution
This marine species occurs off Western Greenland.

References

 Reeve, L. 1846a. Monograph of the genus Pleurotoma. Conchologia Iconica 1 pls. 34–40

External links
 

greenlandica
Gastropods described in 1846